John Hanlon (1892–1976) was a Scottish footballer who played as an outside right.

Early life 
John Hanlon was born in 1892 in Addiewell, West Calder, Scotland to Irish parents, George Hanlon and Ellen/Helen McCrossan of County Donegal.

Career
Hanlon played primarily for Hamilton Academical – he signed for the Accies as a teenager in 1913 a week after being selected for Scotland at junior level, featuring regularly for much of that time.

He moved to Heart of Midlothian in 1916 but only played in one Scottish Football League match during his initial three years at Tynecastle Park and was away from the club for much of the time serving in World War I.

Outside football
Hanlon was a noted athlete (often competing under the pseudonym 'Harris'), his speciality being middle-distance running and particularly the half mile, recording a 1min 55sec time in a meeting at Shawfield Stadium in 1922. He won multiple track events with his regiment (Royal Scots) in a post-war Rhine Army Sports Championship in 1919; during the conflict itself, he was employed as a dispatch runner.

References

1892 births
1976 deaths
Footballers from West Lothian
Scottish footballers
Scottish people of Irish descent
Hamilton Academical F.C. players
Heart of Midlothian F.C. players
Bathgate F.C. players
Fauldhouse United F.C. players
Alloa Athletic F.C. players
Peebles Rovers F.C. players
Stoneyburn F.C. players
Association football outside forwards
Scottish Football League players
Scottish Junior Football Association players
Scotland junior international footballers
British Army personnel of World War I
Royal Scots soldiers